The 2000 Aloha Bowl was a college football bowl game played December 25, 2000 in Honolulu, Hawaii.  It was part of the 2000 NCAA Division I-A football season. It featured the Boston College Eagles of the Big East Conference, and the Arizona State Sun Devils of the Pacific-10 Conference. Boston College won the game, 31–17. This was the final Aloha Bowl.

Scoring summary
Arizona State - Tom Pace 14 yard touchdown run (Barth kick), 11:50 remaining in 1st.
Boston College - Cedric Washington 10 yard touchdown run (Sutphin kick), 10:43 remaining in 1st.
Boston College - 50 yard field goal by Mike Sutphin, 8:20 remaining in 1st.
Arizona State - 28 yard field goal by Mike Barth, 11:17 remaining in 2nd.
Boston College - Dedrick Dewalt 58 yard touchdown pass from Tim Hasselbeck (Sutphin kick), 8:48 remaining in 3rd.
Boston College - Ryan Read 40 yard touchdown pass from Tim Hasselbeck (Sutphin kick), 5:52 remaining in 3rd.
Boston College - Cedric Washington 11 yard touchdown run (Sutphin kick), 11:30 remaining in 4th.
Arizona State - Ryan Dennard 31 yard touchdown pass from Matt Cooper (Barth kick), :51 remaining in 4th.

Statistics

References

Aloha Bowl
Aloha Bowl
Arizona State Sun Devils football bowl games
Boston College Eagles football bowl games
Aloha Bowl
December 2000 sports events in the United States